Four Last Songs is a ballet made by Lorca Massine to Richard Strauss' eponymous music from 1946-48. First presented in 1970 at the workshop of its affiliated School of American Ballet, the New York City Ballet premiere took place on 21 January 1971 at the New York State Theater, Lincoln Center.

Original cast 

Susan Pilarre
Bonnie Moore
Meg Gordon
Johnna Kirkland
Lisa de Ribere
Bonita Borne
Robert Maiorano
Bryan Pitts
Nolan T’Sani

External links 
NY Times review by Clive Barnes, January 23, 1971
NY Times review by Clive Barnes, January 28, 1971

Ballets by Lorca Massine
Ballets to the music of Richard Strauss
1970 ballet premieres
New York City Ballet repertory